Four ships of the Royal Navy have been named HMS Splendid.

  was listed in 1597, with an unknown fate.
  was a S-class submarine, launched in 1942 and sunk in 1943 by a German destroyer.
  was a  nuclear-powered hunter killer submarine.

Battle honours
Ships named Splendid have earned the following battle honours:
Mediterranean, 1942
North Africa, 1942
Falkland Islands, 1982
The Gulf, 2003

Royal Navy ship names